Al Habtoor City is a multi-use development in Business Bay, Dubai, consisting of three hotels (rebranded in July 2018 to Habtoor Palace Dubai, LXR Hotels & Resorts, V Hotel Dubai, Curio Collection by Hilton and Hilton Dubai Al Habtoor City) and three high-rise residential towers commissioned by the Al Habtoor Group in 2012.

The residential three luxurious towers – Noora, Amna and Meera, include two 73-storey residential buildings and a third 52-storey tower with more than 1,400 apartment units, alongside 12 penthouses. Within the Leisure Collection, Al Habtoor City will also feature a 1300-seat permanent water-themed show by Franco Dragone called La Perle, a tennis academy and clubhouse, one of which is air-conditioned, and a car park with a capacity of 5000 cars.

Basic information
Developer: Al Habtoor Group
Main contractor: Habtoor Leighton Group (HLG)
GRC Contractor: Extraco Industries
Total Cost: US $3 billion
Residential capacity: 1,000 apartments
Provencal-style gardens: 27,000 sq. meters
The total built area: approx. 390,000 sq. meters
Architect (Hotels block): Khatib and Alami
Architect (residential blocks): WS Atkins

References

External links

Buildings and structures under construction in Dubai